Mahajeran-e Khak (also Romanized as Mahājerān-e Khāk, Mahajaran Khak, and Mohājerān-e Khāk) is a village in Pol-e Doab Rural District, Zalian District, Shazand County, Markazi Province, Iran. At the 2006 census, its population was 210, in 61 families.

References 

Populated places in Shazand County